Craig Andrew Kanada (born October 2, 1968) is an American professional golfer. He was born in Portland, Oregon.

Kanada played on the Nationwide Tour in 1994–96, 1998–99, 2000, 2002, 2006, and 2009–10. He was a member of the PGA Tour in 1997, 2001, 2007 and 2008.

He won two tournaments on the Nationwide Tour in 2006 and finished 11th on the money list. That allowed him to move up to the PGA Tour.

Amateur wins (2)
1990 Western Amateur
1991 Pacific Northwest Amateur

Professional wins (2)

Nationwide Tour wins (2)

Nationwide Tour playoff record (0–1)

Results in major championships

CUT = missed the half-way cut
Note: Kanada only played in the U.S. Open.

See also
1996 PGA Tour Qualifying School graduates
2000 PGA Tour Qualifying School graduates
2006 Nationwide Tour graduates

External links

American male golfers
Ohio State Buckeyes men's golfers
PGA Tour golfers
Korn Ferry Tour graduates
Golfers from Portland, Oregon
1968 births
Living people